Orlando Brown (September 26, 1801July 6, 1867) was a Kentucky politician, newspaper publisher and historian, who also held the office of Indian Commissioner during the Zachary Taylor administration. Brown was a Whig and an anti-secessionist. He was the son of John Brown, Kentucky's first member of Congress.

Orlando Brown received his appointment as Commissioner of Indian Affairs based on his loyalty to the Taylor campaign, and used it to distribute further patronage appointments. He became disillusioned with the position, and resigned it on July 1, 1850, eight days before Taylor died.

Brown spent most of his later years working on a history of Kentucky governors, but his work was uncompleted when he died in 1867.

References

External links

1801 births
1867 deaths
United States Bureau of Indian Affairs personnel
19th-century American journalists
American male journalists
19th-century American male writers